Tall Tanah is a village in northern Aleppo Governorate, northwestern Syria.

Administratively the village belongs to Nahiya Akhtarin in Azaz District. Nearby localities include Talatayna  to the north, and Ablah  to the south. In the 2004 census, Tall Tanah had a population of 1,148.

References

Populated places in Aleppo Governorate